Evolutionary Behavioral Sciences is a quarterly peer-reviewed academic journal published by the American Psychological Association. It was established in 2007 as the Journal of Social, Evolutionary, and Cultural Psychology, and obtained its current name in January 2014. EBS publishes manuscripts that advance the study of human behavior from an evolutionary perspective, with an emphasis on work that integrates evolutionary theory with other approaches and perspectives from across the behavioral sciences.  The journal is published in partnership with the NorthEastern Evolutionary Psychology Society.

Abstracting and indexing 
The journal is abstracted and indexed in Academic Search Complete, International Bibliography of the Social Sciences, PsycINFO, and Scopus.

Editors 
The current editor-in-chief is Catherine Salmon (University of Redlands).

References

External links 
 

American Psychological Association academic journals
Quarterly journals
English-language journals
Evolutionary psychology journals
Publications established in 2007